The local assembly of episcopate is the Central African Episcopal Conference (French: Conférence Episcopal Centrafricaine), established in 1970.
The CAEC is a member of the Association of Episcopal Conferences of the Region of Central Africa and Symposium of Episcopal Conferences of Africa and Madagascar (SECAM).

List of presidents of the Bishops' Conference:

1970-1997: Joachim N'Dayen, Archbishop of Bangui

1997-2005: Paulin Pomodimo, Bishop of Bossangoa and Archbishop of Bangui

2005-2008: François-Xavier Yombandje, Bishop of Bossangoa

2008-2009: Paulin Pomodimo, Archbishop of Bangui

2009-2010: Armando Umberto Gianni, Bishop of Bouar

from 2010: Édouard Mathos, Bishop of Bambari

See also
Episcopal conference
Catholic Church in Africa

References

External links
 https://web.archive.org/web/20121201044219/http://cecarca.org/topic/index.html
 http://www.gcatholic.org/dioceses/country/CF.htm
 http://www.catholic-hierarchy.org/country/cf.html 

Central African Republic
Catholic Church in the Central African Republic
Christian organizations established in 1970

it:Chiesa_cattolica_nella_Repubblica_Centrafricana#Conferenza_episcopale